The 5th constituency of the Vaucluse (French: Cinquième circonscription de Vaucluse) is a French legislative constituency in the Vaucluse département. Like the other 576 French constituencies, it elects one MP using the two-round system, with a run-off if no candidate receives over 50% of the vote in the first round.

Description
The 5th constituency of the Vaucluse is the largest within the department, covering a large area in the east.

The seat was created as a result of the 2010 redistricting of French legislative constituencies which added a constituency in the Vaucluse.

Assembly Members

Election results

2022

 
 
 
 
|-
| colspan="8" bgcolor="#E9E9E9"|
|-

2017

 
 
 
 
 
 
|-
| colspan="8" bgcolor="#E9E9E9"|
|-

2012

 
 
 
 
 
|-
| colspan="8" bgcolor="#E9E9E9"|
|-

References

5